Janne Mugame (born 10 March 1980) is Estonian retired para swimmer. At the 2000 Summer Paralympics in Sydney, she won a bronze medal in the Women's 50m backstroke S14

References

Living people
1980 births
Swimmers from Tallinn
Paralympic swimmers of Estonia
Swimmers at the 2000 Summer Paralympics
Medalists at the 2000 Summer Paralympics
Medalists at the World Para Swimming Championships
S14-classified Paralympic swimmers
21st-century Estonian people